Sacubitril (INN) is an antihypertensive drug used in combination with valsartan. The combination drug sacubitril/valsartan, known during trials as LCZ696 and marketed under the brand name Entresto, is a treatment for heart failure. It was approved under the FDA's priority review process for use in heart failure on July 7, 2015.

Side effects 
Sacubitril increases levels of bradykinin, which is responsible for the edema seen sometimes in patients with the medication. This is why the medication is not recommended for patients with a history of pulmonary edema with the usage of ACE inhibitors.

Mechanism of action
Sacubitril is a prodrug that is activated to sacubitrilat (LBQ657) by de-ethylation via esterases. Sacubitrilat inhibits the enzyme neprilysin, which is responsible for the degradation of atrial and brain natriuretic peptide, two blood pressure–lowering peptides that work mainly by reducing blood volume. In addition, neprilysin degrades a variety of peptides including bradykinin, an inflammatory mediator.

See also 
 Omapatrilat

References 

Antihypertensive agents
Biphenyls
Carboxylate esters
Ethyl esters
Prodrugs
Butyramides
Carboxylic acids